Xəlfəli or Khalfali may refer to:
Xəlfəli, Imishli, Azerbaijan
Xəlfəli, Sabirabad, Azerbaijan
Xəlfəli, Shusha, Azerbaijan